Wagnerism may refer to:

Composer Richard Wagner's philosophical and artistic ideals
Houston Stewart Chamberlain, called the "Champion of Wagnerism"
Wagner controversies
Richard Wagner's style of music, for example, Alberto Franchetti
Wagnerianism and Czech National Identity, 1870 writing by Czech historian and musicologist Otakar Hostinský
 a form of adversarial labour union legislation represented by the Wagner Act in the United States
Wagnerism: Art and Politics in the Shadow of Music (2020), book by music critic Alex Ross